Creteuchiloglanis is a genus of sisorid catfishes native to Asia.

Species
There are currently 7 recognized species in this genus:
 Creteuchiloglanis arunachalensis Sinha & Tamang, 2014 
 Creteuchiloglanis brachypterus W. Zhou, X. Li & A. W. Thomson, 2011
 Creteuchiloglanis gongshanensis X. L. Chu, 1981
 Creteuchiloglanis kamengensis Jayaram, 1966
 Creteuchiloglanis longipectoralis W. Zhou, X. Li & A. W. Thomson, 2011
 Creteuchiloglanis macropterus H. H. Ng, 2004
 Creteuchiloglanis payjab Darshan, Dutta, Kachari, Gogoi, Aran & D. N. Das, 2014

References

Sisoridae
Fish of Asia
Freshwater fish genera
Catfish genera
Taxa named by Zhou Wei (zoologist)